The Cork Junior A Football Championship (known for sponsorship reasons as the Co-Op Superstores Cork Junior A Football Championship and abbreviated to the Cork JAFC) is an annual Gaelic football competition organised by the Cork County Board of the Gaelic Athletic Association and contested by the top-ranking junior clubs in the county of Cork in Ireland. It is the fifth tier overall in the entire Cork football championship system.

The Cork Junior Championship was introduced in 1895 as a countywide competition for teams deemed not eligible for the senior grade or second-string senior teams. At the time of its creation it was the second tier of Cork football.

In its current format, the Cork Junior A Championship begins in September following the completion of the eight Divisional Junior Championships. The 8 participating teams compete in a single-elimination tournament which culminates with the final match at Páirc Uí Rinn in October or November. The winner of the Cork Junior A Championship, as well as being presented with the Donal O'Sullivan Cup, qualifies for the subsequent Munster Club Championship.

The competition has been won by 65 teams, 29 of which have won it more than once. Nils are the most successful team in the tournament's history, having won it 7 times each. Kilmurry are the title holders, defeating Cobh by 1-12 to 0-08 in the 2022 final.

History
Established in 1895 as a championship for the second teams of clubs playing in the Cork Senior Championship, the junior championship was initially played on a countywide basis. With the creation of the Cork Intermediate Championship in 1909, victorious clubs in the junior grade were gained promotion to the intermediate grade.

As more and more clubs were founded, the decision was taken in 1926 to organise the junior championship on a divisional basis. Each of the eight divisions provided their championship-winning team to represent their division in the county championship.

After the intermediate grade was disbanded in 1939, the winners of the Cork Junior Championship gained promotion to the Cork Senior Championship. This system of promotion and relegation lasted until 1964 when the intermediate grade was reintroduced.

In 2017 the eight divisional runners-up were also allowed to field teams in the junior championship.

Sponsorship
Since 2005 the Junior Championship has been sponsored by the Evening Echo.  The championship was previously sponsored by Permanent TSB.

Trophy
The winning team is presented with the Donal O'Sullivan Cup. Donal O'Sullivan played club football with Lees, before winning back-to-back Munster medals in 1956 and 1957 with the Cork senior team. He later served in a number of administrative roles, including vice-chairman and chairman of the Cork County Board and chairman of the Munster Council.

Qualification
The Cork Junior Football Championship features eight teams in the final tournament. Approximately 80 teams contest the eight divisional championships with the eight divisional champions qualifying for the county series.

Teams

Roll of honour

By Division

List of finals

 Midleton beat Bantry Blues in other semi-final but both were disqualified so Kilmurry were awarded the title
 In 1923, Glanmire won title in replay
 1918 – Youghal and Meelin qualified for final which was not played
 1896 Midleton won title in replay

Records

Gaps
 Top ten longest gaps between successive championship titles:
 93 years: Youghal (1906–1999)
 52 years: Mitchelstown (1961–2013)
 51 years: Millstreet (1963–2014)
 45 years: Kilmurray (1924–1969)
 44 years: Bantry Blues (1928–1972)
 41 years: Ballincollig (1940–1981)
 40 years: Bandon (1975–2015)
 39 years: Fermoy (1936–1974)
 39 years: Canovee (1968–2007)
 38 years: Glanworth (1971–2009)

Junior B Football Championship

Junior B Inter-Divisional Football Championship

Junior C Football Championship

Sources
 Cork Junior Football Champions

References

 3
Junior Gaelic football county championships